Ghofran Khelifi (born 9 July 1998) is a Tunisian judoka. She is a gold medalist at the African Games. She is also a three-time gold medalist at the African Judo Championships. She represented Tunisia at the 2020 Summer Olympics held in Tokyo, Japan.

Career 

She won the gold medal in the women's 57 kg event at the 2017 African Judo Championships held in Antananarivo, Madagascar. A year later, she won one of the bronze medals in this event at the 2018 African Judo Championships held in Tunis, Tunisia. In that year, she also won one of the bronze medals in the women's 57 kg event at the 2018 Mediterranean Games held in Tarragona, Spain. In 2019, she won the gold medal in the women's 57 kg event at the African Judo Championships held in Cape Town, South Africa. At the 2020 African Judo Championships held in Antananarivo, Madagascar, she won one of the bronze medals in her event.

In January 2021, she competed in the women's 57 kg event at the Judo World Masters held in Doha, Qatar. At the 2021 African Judo Championships held in Dakar, Senegal, she won the gold medal in her event. In June 2021, she competed in the women's 57 kg event at the World Judo Championships held in Budapest, Hungary where she was eliminated in her first match by Sanne Verhagen of the Netherlands.

She competed in the women's 57 kg event at the 2020 Summer Olympics held in Tokyo, Japan where she was eliminated in her first match by Ivelina Ilieva of Bulgaria.

Achievements

References

External links 
 

Living people
1998 births
Place of birth missing (living people)
Tunisian female judoka
Mediterranean Games bronze medalists for Tunisia
Mediterranean Games medalists in judo
Competitors at the 2018 Mediterranean Games
African Games medalists in judo
African Games gold medalists for Tunisia
Competitors at the 2019 African Games
Judoka at the 2020 Summer Olympics
Olympic judoka of Tunisia
21st-century Tunisian women